Solanum spirale is a small fruiting shrub in the family Solanaceae, present in mid-elevation (500 to 1,900 m) paleotropical areas, in Southern China, India, Burma, Thailand, Laos, Vietnam, Indonesia and Australia (Queensland).

It is widely cultivated in dooryard gardens in India, Thailand, and Laos and used for:
 food (cooked young leaves, raw or cooked berries)
 medicine (roots used as a narcotic and diuretic in Assam; bark macerate used as a febrifuge in Laos).

References
  (2005):  – Solanum spirale. Version of March 2007. Retrieved 2009-06-01.
 Solanum spirale entry @ Flora of China database.

spirale
Flora of China
Flora of tropical Asia
Flora of Queensland